The 2015 Hua Hin Championships was a professional tennis tournament played on indoor hard courts. It was the first edition of the tournament, which was part of the 2015 ATP Challenger Tour and part of 2015 WTA 125K series. It took place in Hua Hin, Thailand between 2 November to 8 November 2015 for the men's tournament, and between 9 November to 15 November 2015 for the women's tournament.

ATP singles main-draw entrants

Seeds

 1 Rankings are as of 26 October 2015.

Other entrants
The following players received wildcards into the singles main draw:
  Puriwat Chatpatcharoen
  Pruchya Isaro
  Warit Sornbutnark
  Kittipong Wachiramanowong

The following player received entry into the singles main draw with a protected ranking:
  Amir Weintraub

The following players received entry from the qualifying draw:
  Riccardo Ghedin
  Jirat Navasirisomboon
  Stéphane Robert
  Laurent Rochette

The following player received entry as a lucky loser:
  Toshihide Matsui

Withdrawals

  Matija Pecotic →replaced by  Toshihide Matsui

Retirements

  Yuki Bhambri (right elbow injury)
  Yan Bai (stomach upset)
  Ti Chen (neck injury)

ATP doubles main-draw entrants

Seeds

Other entrants

The following teams received wildcards into the doubles main draw:

  John Paul Fruttero /  Kittipong Wachiramanowong 
  Puriwat Chatpatcharoen /  Warit Sornbutnark
  Pruchya Isaro /  Nuttanon Kadchapanan

The following teams received entry by a protected ranking:

  Peter Gojowczyk /  Amir Weintraub

Withdrawals

During the tournament

  Andre Begemann /  Purav Raja (unspecified)

Retirements

  Gong Maoxin (dizziness)

WTA singles main-draw entrants

Seeds

 1 Rankings are as of 2 November 2015.

Other entrants
The following players received wildcards into the singles main draw:
  Kamonwan Buayam
  Noppawan Lertcheewakarn
  Bunyawi Thamchaiwat
  Varatchaya Wongteanchai

The following players received entry from the qualifying draw:
  Akgul Amanmuradova
  Shuko Aoyama
  Liu Chang
  Lu Jiajing

WTA doubles main-draw entrants

Seeds

Other entrants

The following team received wildcards into the doubles main draw:

  Kamonwan Buayam /  Nudnida Luangnam

Champions

Men's singles

  Yūichi Sugita def.  Stéphane Robert 6–2, 1–6, 6–3

Men's doubles

  Lee Hsin-han /  Lu Yen-hsun def.  Andre Begemann /  Purav Raja walkover

Women's singles

  Yaroslava Shvedova def.  Naomi Osaka 6–4, 6–7(8–10), 6–4

Women's doubles

  Liang Chen /  Wang Yafan def.  Varatchaya Wongteanchai /  Yang Zhaoxuan 6–3, 6–4

External links 
 WTA site

 
 ATP Challenger Tour
 WTA 125K series
 in women's tennis
Tennis, ATP Challenger Tour, Hua Hin Challenger
Tennis, WTA 125K series, Hua Hin Challenger

Tennis, ATP Challenger Tour, Bangkok Challenger